Murrough O'Brien may refer to:
Murrough O'Brien, 1st Earl of Thomond (died 1551)
Murrough O'Brien, 4th Baron Inchiquin (died 1597)
Murrough O'Brien, 1st Earl of Inchiquin (c. 1618–1674)
Murrough O'Brien, 1st Marquess of Thomond (1726–1808)
Morrough Parker O'Brien (1902–1988)